Acrocomia hassleri is a species of palm which is native to southern Brazil (State of Mato Grosso do Sul) and Paraguay.

References

hassleri
Flora of Brazil
Flora of Paraguay
Environment of Mato Grosso do Sul
Plants described in 1900